Acheson is a locality and an industrial area in Alberta, Canada, within Parkland County.

Acheson is located on the Canadian National (CN) main line and Highway 60 (Devonian Way) between Highway 16A (Parkland Highway) and Highway 16 (Yellowhead Highway).

The locality is named after A. Acheson Tisdal, a railway official. Acheson was founded as a repair facility for CN with industrial development following in the 1970s. It is recognized as a major employment area by the Edmonton Metropolitan Region Board.

Acheson Industrial Area 

The Acheson Industrial Area is the economic development hub of Parkland County. Its  of land is home to over 200 businesses. The Acheson Business Association established in 2004.

Within the Acheson Area Structure Plan, the industrial area borders the City of Edmonton to the east, Highway 16 to the north, Spruce Valley Road to the west, and Highway 628 to the south. Industrial parks within the Acheson Industrial Area include the Ellis Industrial Park, the Sherwin Industrial Park, and West Acheson Industrial.

References

External links 
Acheson Business Association
Parkland County

Industrial parks in Canada
Localities in Parkland County